John Maurice may refer to:
 John Maurice, Prince of Nassau-Siegen
 John D. Maurice, American journalist

See also